Devante Bond (born July 3, 1993) is an American football linebacker for the Dallas Cowboys of the National Football League (NFL). He was drafted by the Tampa Bay Buccaneers in the sixth round of the 2016 NFL Draft. He played college football at Oklahoma.

Professional career

Tampa Bay Buccaneers
Bond was drafted by the Tampa Bay Buccaneers in the sixth round, 183rd overall, in the 2016 NFL Draft. On September 23, 2016, he was placed on injured reserve with a hamstring injury.

On September 24, 2017, he made his NFL debut in a Week 3 game against Minnesota Vikings. On October 5, 2017, he recorded his first career tackle in a game against the New England Patriots.

On September 1, 2018, Bond was placed on injured reserve. On September 11, 2018, Bond was waived from the Buccaneers with an injury settlement. On October 17, 2018, Bond was re-signed by the Buccaneers.

On March 5, 2019, Bond re-signed with the Buccaneers. On October 15, 2019, Bond was released by the Buccaneers. He was suspended four weeks by the NFL for violating the league's performance-enhancing drugs policy on October 18, 2019. He was reinstated from suspension on November 12, 2019.

Chicago Bears
On December 9, 2019, Bond was signed by the Chicago Bears.

On February 22, 2020, Bond re-signed with the Bears. He was released on July 26. He was re-signed to their practice squad on September 18. He was elevated to the active roster the next day for the team's week 2 game against the New York Giants, and reverted to the practice squad after the game. He was elevated again on October 8 for the team's week 5 game against the Tampa Bay Buccaneers, and reverted to the practice squad again following the game. He was placed on the practice squad/injured list on October 9, and restored to the practice squad on December 9. His practice squad contract with the team expired after the season on January 18, 2021.

Dallas Cowboys
On December 30, 2021, Bond was signed to the Dallas Cowboys practice squad. He signed a reserve/future contract with the Cowboys on January 18, 2022. He was placed on injured reserve on July 8, 2022 after suffering a season-ending knee injury in OTAs.

References

External links
Tampa Bay Buccaneers bio
Oklahoma Sooners bio

1993 births
Living people
American football linebackers
Oklahoma Sooners football players
Players of American football from Sacramento, California
Tampa Bay Buccaneers players
Chicago Bears players
Dallas Cowboys players